This is a timeline of sports broadcasting on Channel 5.

1990s
 1997
31 March – On its first night on air, Channel 5 launches its overnight coverage of American sports when it broadcasts the first edition of Live & Dangerous. The programme broadcasts on weekdays through the night and includes live coverage of American sport as well as highlights from American and other global sports events. The first programme features the opening day of the 1997 Major League Baseball season.
31 May – Even though Channel 5 had said that it hadn't been intending to show live sport at peak time, it buys the rights to one of England's qualifying matches for the 1998 World Cup – an away match against Poland. It also shows the first of two international games of England's rugby union tour of Argentina.
Autumn – Football on 5 fully launches as football becomes a regular fixture of the channel's output following the purchases of rights to UEFA Cup games and away qualifying matches involving the home nations, showing the latter for the next decade.

 1998
 March – MLB on Five launches when Channel 5 decides to create a specific programme for its coverage of Major League Baseball.

 1999
 Channel 5 replaces Channel 4 as the terrestrial broadcaster of the NFL and airs coverage for the next six seasons.

2000s 
 2000
 Channel 5 begins showing live coverage of MotoGP. It shows the event for the next three seasons.
 Channel 5 broadcasts weekly highlights of the English Premiership, and does so for just one season.

 2001
 30 May-10 June – Channel 5 broadcasts the FIFA Confederations Cup. Channel 5 also shows the next two tournaments.

 2002
 Channel 5 buys the rights to the Scottish League Cup and shows the tournament for the next two seasons.

 2003
 No events.

 2004
 June – Channel 5’s regular coverage of the National Hockey League ends for two years when the primary broadcast rights move to NASN.

2005
 No events.

 2006
 May – Channel 5 becomes the terrestrial home of highlights of England cricket's home matches.
 September – Channel 5 resumes its coverage of the National Hockey League.

 2007
September – 
Five gains the rights to broadcast Serie A highlights and live games in the 2007–08 season. with live games shown weekly at 1:30pm UK time on Sundays. Coverage is shown under the name of Football Italiano.
The NFL returns to Channel 5 when it signs a deal to broadcast Monday Night Football and NBC Sunday Night Football.
 Channel 5’s decade-long coverage of showing away fixtures of UK nations' international football teams ends.

 2008
 27 June – Five decides to end its coverage of Serie A after just a single season.
 29 October – MLB on Five is broadcast for the final time to co-inside with Channel 5 deciding to end its coverage of Major League Baseball due to the Global recession of 2008-09.
 11–21 December – Channel 5 shows live coverage of the 2008 FIFA Club World Cup.

 2009
 12 June – Channel 5’s coverage of the NHL finishes. It also ends its coverage of the NBA at the same time.
 September – Channel 5 becomes the lead broadcaster of the UEFA Europa League meaning it can show the entire tournament, including the final, for the first time. Previously it had only been able to show the early rounds due to the BBC or ITV having the rights from the quarter-finals onwards.
 9 September – Channel 5 signs a deal to broadcast highlights of the Ultimate Fighting Championship (UFC) on terrestrial television in the UK.

2010s
2010
 Channel 5 ends its live overnight coverage of American sport, when it decides not to continue its coverage of American Football. This brings to an end its coverage of American sport which had been a mainstay of Channel 5's weeknight overnight programming since the channel’s launch.

2011
 Channel 5 broadcasts the Great Birmingham Run and Great South Run for the first time. This is the channel's first coverage of athletics.

2012
 9 May – Channel 5’s fifteen years of showing Europe’s second tier football clubs competition ends when it shows live coverage of the 2012 UEFA Europa League Final.
 28 July – Football on 5 ends after the channel stops showing live football following the transfer of the rights to show the UEFA Europa League to ITV. The last game to be shown is a pre-season friendly.

2013
 No events.

2014
No events.

2015
 Channel 5 expands its coverage of Mixed Martial Arts when it begins showing highlights to every BAMMA event.
 8 August – Football returns to Channel 5 when it takes over the contract to broadcast highlights of the Football League and the League Cup. It launches two new programmes under the revived Football on 5 banner. They are called The Championship and The Goal Rush. The programmes are broadcast from 9pm on Saturday evening.

2016
 4 September – Channel 5 acquires the UK broadcasting rights to Formula E from the 2016–17 season following Formula E's termination of its contract with ITV. It shows all races from round three and then shows all of the following season.

2017
 Coverage of MotoGP returns to Channel 5 although this time the coverage of restricted to highlights only. Channel 5 covers the event for the next two years.
 September – Channel 5 takes over from ITV as broadcaster of highlights of the  Premiership Rugby . The deal also sees five matches per season broadcast live by the channel. This is the first time that the league has been shown live on terrestrial TV. The also includes highlights of the Premiership Rugby Cup.

2018
 6 May – Football League Tonight is broadcast for the final time, thereby ending Channel 5’s three-year deal to show highlights of the English Football League.

2019
 15 September – After 14 seasons, Channel 5 shows cricket highlights for the final time. The rights transfer to the BBC from 2020 onwards.

2020s
 2020
 14 September – Channel 5, now part of the CBS Sports family, resumes its coverage of the NFL when it starts showing the weekly Monday night game plus a weekly highlights show produced by CBS Sports.

2021
 No events.

2022
 2 March – Wasserman Boxing and Channel 5 announce a deal which will see Channel 5 air five fight nights Wasserman Boxing-promoted fight nights during 2022. This is later extended to cover 2023.

References

Channel 5
Channel 5
Channel 5
Channel 5
Sports television in the United Kingdom
Channel 5